Carlos Manuel (born 1973) is a Cuban singer, known simply as "Carlos Manuel".

Career in Cuba

Carlos Manuel had been a member of the Mayohuacan, Carapacho and Irakere groups in Cuba, and had had success within Cuba as vocalist with Carlos Manuel y su Clan, which he founded in 1997.  In 2001, he was voted the most popular artist in Cuba, Clan decreed the best new band, and his song "Malo Cantidad" the most listened to.

In 2003,  after performing a concert in Mexico City, Pruneda boarded a plane and flew to Monterrey, Mexico. He boarded a cab and drove to the US border crossing at Brownsville, Texas where he asked for asylum.

NEW CD IN THE UNITED STATES

Title: Carlos Manuel

Producers: Carlos Manuel & Jossel Calveiro

Carlos Manuel has finally released his first production in Miami titled "Carlos Manuel."
Carlos Manuel has had the CD in stores for three weeks and his latest hit "El amor eres tu" it is now in the top of the Spanish broadcasting radio "Salsa 98.3"

"This Cd has influenced me in every way, I have made songs for everyone in this production, and i have a lot more to come" Said Carlos Manuel Pruneda, whom it is now living in Coral Gables and currently working on his second production in the United States to conquest the world."

References

1973 births
Living people
Cuban male singers
Cuban musicians